Claudia Mandrysch (born 27 September 1969) is a German former footballer who played as a defender. She made two appearances for the Germany national team in 1995.

References

External links
 

1969 births
Living people
German women's footballers
Women's association football defenders
Germany women's international footballers
Place of birth missing (living people)